Surab may refer to:

Surab, Pakistan, a town in Balochistan, Pakistan
Sirab, village and municipality of Nakhchivan, Azerbaijan
Surab, Iranshahr, a village in Sistan and Baluchetan Province, Iran
Surab, Qaen, a village in South Khorasan Province, Iran

See also 
 Sohrab (disambiguation)
 Zurab, Georgian name